Minneapolis is a community located along US 19-E in Avery County, North Carolina, United States.  It shares its name with two other cities nationwide: another small town in Kansas, and the much larger and more famous city of Minneapolis, Minnesota, that state's largest city.

History
As early as 1904, the East Tennessee and Western North Carolina Railroad went through the community of Minneapolis, but bypassed it as it traveled between Cranberry and Montezuma.  In 1910 a depot was built, mainly to service a sawmill and asbestos factory; in 1937, the depot was abandoned, but flag stops still continued till 1940.  After the rails were removed, the railway bed became the foundation for Old Toe River Road.

See also
 Big Yellow Mountain
 East Tennessee and Western North Carolina Railroad
 North Toe River

References

Unincorporated communities in North Carolina
Unincorporated communities in Avery County, North Carolina
Populated places established in 1910